Larroque (Argentina) is a city in the Entre Ríos Province, in north-eastern Argentina. It is located on the South of the province, between Gualeguay and Gualeguaychú. It has a population of 6,451 according to the 2010 Census.

History 
Larroque was officially founded in 1909, when the train station of the same name of the General Urquiza Railway was inaugurated. The first settlers had established there in the 19th century, when the place was known as Kilometer 23. It is a municipality of first class since 1986.

Notable residents and natives
 Annemarie Heinrich, photographer. 
 María Esther de Miguel, writer.
 Alfredo Yabrán, businessman.
 Agustín Velotti, tennis player.
Andrew Graham-Yooll, journalist and historian

References

Populated places in Entre Ríos Province
Cities in Argentina
Argentina
Entre Ríos Province